Part of the Tampa–Hillsborough County Public Library System (THPL), the Seffner-Mango Branch Library is a 15,000 square feet facility located on 410 N Kingsway Road, in Seffner, Florida. It holds 84,524 volumes and offers free wireless access, 14 Internet-connected computers, photocopiers, public FAX access, snack/beverage vending machines, and a public meeting room. The Seffner-Mango Branch serves the two communities of Seffner and Mango.

History 
The Seffner-Mango Branch Library was originally in the space next to Walmart in the Mango Plaza located on E. Dr. Martin Luther King, Jr. Blvd.  In 2009, after a decade in that location, it reopened in its current location on Kingsway Road in Seffner on January 15, 2009. 
Since its relocation to that area, it has seen a steady stream of patrons that utilize its services and collections.

Services

Friends of the Library 

While this is not technically a service, the Friends of the Library operate a book store in the branch lobby. The proceeds from the store go towards funding the library programs and providing support for library operations

Among its services, the library also has events like Movie and Popcorn Night, Story Time, and a Summer Garden Club, Seffner Stitching Society, Once a Month Book Discussions as well as a game zone.

Special Collections 
The Seffner-Mango Branch Library has acquired a "distinctive collection of photographs." These photographs have been taken by the photojournalist Carlton Ward Jr., who is from Tampa, Florida. These photos can be found throughout the reading room and in the children's area of the library

References 

Public libraries in Florida